Mehandi Laga Ke Rakhna is a 2017 Indian Bhojpuri-language film written and directed by Rajnish Mishra and produced by Ananjay Raghuraj under the banner of "Ananya Craft And Visions" and presented by "Om Sai Ram Entertainment" with the association of "Trimurti Entertainment Media". It is a remake of the 2007 Telugu film Aadavari Matalaku Arthale Verule. The stars are Khesari Lal Yadav and Kajal Raghwani with Ritu Singh, Awdhesh Mishra, Sanjay Pandey, Sanjay Mahanand, Karan Pandey, Deepak Sinha, Anand Mohan and others in supporting roles.   Choreographers from the Bhojpuri Cinema industry Kanu Mukharjee and Glori Mohanta make a special appearance in the song "Sakhi Re Var Pa Gaini".

The film spawned two sequels, Mehandi Laga Ke Rakhna 2 released in 2018 and Mehandi Laga Ke Rakhna 3 release in 2020.

Plot
The film begins with the venture of Raja, who is unemployed. But like every father, Raja's father Narayan wants the Raja to do some work, but the Raja messes up all the work with his wrong activities, all of which expel him from his job, Narayan is very upset with these activities.

One day Raja finds a beautiful girl named Kajal and learns that he is a music teacher at school. Raja starts working with Kajal in school as a peon, and Narayan is pleased with Raja's improvement and job. After a few days, the entire school goes to the "Swachhata Abhiyan" where Raja expresses his love to Kajal, who feels bad and slaps Raja. 

Narayan gets to know the whole thing and takes him to a friend's house for entertaining Raja, where the friend's (Mahendra Babu) daughter marriage, Raja meets all the family members of Mahendra Babu. But his surprise does not remain when he sees that the girl who has come to the wedding is no other girl she is Kajal, whom he loves.

After that, the Raja stops at Kajal's home, and helps in the preparation of his wedding. Then slowly, Kajal gets so impressed by the goodness of Raja that she starts loving him, and the day after Kajal expresses her love to Raja, her wedding procession will come only two days later. This is the story of how the Raja and Kajal decide between love and rituals.

Cast
 Khesari Lal Yadav as Raja
 Kajal Raghwani, as Kajal
 Ritu Singh as Babli
 Awdhesh Mishra, as Narayan (Raja's Father)
 Sanjay Mahanand as Raja's Friend
 Sanjay Pandey as Main Villan
 Karan Pandey as Sanaku
Param Hans Singh as Mahendra Babu (Kajal's Father) 
Anand Mohan as Fufaji (Babli's Father) 
Deepak Sinha
Dhama Verma
Sweaty Singh
Dhiraj Singh
 Gopal Rai
Glory Mohanta as Special Appearance in song "Sakhi Re Var Pa Gaini"
Kanu Mukharjee as Special Appearance in song "Sakhi Re Var Pa Gaini"

Production
Filming for this film was done in Lucky Studio, Halol, Gujarat with some scenes shot in Nandan Van, Mumbai. 

The cinematography has been done by Rafiq Latif Shaikh while choreography is by Kanu Mukharjee and Ricky Gupta. it was edited by Jeetendra Singh (Jitu) and its action director is Bajirao. Dress designed by Badshah Khan. Background music scored by Aslam Surty while sound designed by Satish Poojary (Audio Lab) . Post-production done by Audio Lab Studio.

Release
The film was theatrically released on 2 February 2017 in All over India with positive public reviews. It has broken all records on box office and it is all time blockbuster of Bhojpuri cinema.

Soundtrack

The music for "Mehandi Laga Ke Rakhna" was composed by Rajnish Mishra with lyrics penned by Pyare Lal Yadav, Rajnish Mishra and Shyam Dehati. Background music scored by Aslam Surty. The soundtrack included an unusually large number of songs at 10. It was produced under the "Worldwide Records Bhojpuri" label, who also bought his satellite rights.

His first song "Kawna Devta Ke Garhal Sawarl" released on 27 May 2017 and crossed over 99 millions views on YouTube and second song "Laga Ke Fair Lovely" released on 4 June 2017 and crossed over 65 millions views on YouTube. Third song "Sarso Ke Sagiya" released on 13 June 2017 on official YouTube handle of "Worldwide Records Bhojpuri" and he crossed over 166 millions views on YouTube. All song of this film was superhit and create a new history on YouTube.

Marketing
The film was stream online on 29 July 2017 at online video platform site YouTube and create a record of the third Bhojpuri film to get 40 million views on YouTube after "Nirahua Rikshawala 2" and "Nirahua Hindustani 2" till April 2018. He got over 122 millions views on YouTube till now.

Award and nominations

References

2017 films
Bhojpuri remakes of Telugu films
2010s Bhojpuri-language films